Lake Alatskivi is a lake of Estonia.

See also
List of lakes of Estonia

Alatskivi
Alatskivi Parish
Alatskivi